The Zama and Shibuya shootings were the double spree shootings in Japan on July 29, 1965 by , which left one police officer dead and 17 people injured, at the conclusion of which he was captured by police officers. Katagiri was later executed.

Timeline 
Katagiri was born in Setagaya, Tokyo and reportedly loved guns. On July 29, 1965, he shot dead one policeman and injured another with a rifle in Zama, Kanagawa Prefecture. He stole a handgun and hijacked four cars. In Shibuya, Tokyo, he entered a gun shop near the Shibuya fire station and took four hostages, which resulted in a gun battle with the police. About 5,000 people, including Norio Nagayama, witnessed the gunfight, during which he injured 16 people. One hostage attacked him and police officers eventually captured him. Katagiri was sentenced to life imprisonment instead of being in jail he was sentenced to death and was executed on July 21, 1972.

See Also
 Capital punishment in Japan
 List of major crimes in Japan

References

External links
 少年ライフル魔事件

Hostage taking in Japan
Deaths by firearm in Japan
Murder in Japan
History of Kanagawa Prefecture
Shibuya
Spree shootings in Japan
1965 in Tokyo
1965 murders in Japan
July 1965 events in Asia